Riverton is a southeastern suburb of Perth, the capital city of Western Australia. Its local government area is the City of Canning.

Location
The Canning River makes some of its north eastern boundary. It is part of the City of Canning, situated south east of the Swan River. The main roads that pass through Riverton are Leach Highway, High Road and Vahland Avenue.

History
The suburb began by a subdivision in 1917. It was referred to locally as Riverton Bridge in 1937 due to the old timber Riverton Bridge that crosses the Canning River to the suburb, and to distinguish it from the South Australian suburb of Riverton.

Amenities 
Riverton has its local library with recreational facilities known as the Riverton Leisureplex. Situated in adjoining Parkwood is Stockland Riverton shopping centre, often referred to by its former name of Riverton Forum, which provides locals with everyday essentials.

There are two primary schools: the independent public school Riverton Primary School, and the private Catholic school Queen of Apostles. The suburb has no secondary schools and is in the intake area of both Lynwood Senior High School in Parkwood and Rossmoyne Senior High School in Bull Creek.

Adenia Road Park 
Adenia Road Park forms part of the Canning River Regional Park. It includes the Canning River, Adenia Park Lagoon, natural bush walk paths, dog exercise area, bike path, lookouts and a playground. It links between the Canning River Regional Park in Ferndale and the parkland beside Riverton Bridge.

Clune Park 
Clune Park is an area located in Riverton, managed by the City of Canning. In 1928, the Christian Brothers purchased 62.4 hectares (160 acres) of land just east of the Riverton Bridge naming it Clune Park. Clune Park is named after the Catholic Archbishop Patrick Clune.

Montes Square 

Riverton Primary School

The area is well served by a good quality primary school that supposedly ranks quite high academically in Western Australia.

Location 
Riverton is situated about a twenty-minute drive away from Perth city and a ten-minute drive away from Bull Creek, the local train station. Riverton is a quiet suburb, with low rates of crime and violence, due to the fact that a large portion of the residents are either retired or elderly, although this is changing, with young families moving in more frequently, thanks to its ideal location and atmosphere.

References

External links

Suburbs of Perth, Western Australia
Canning River (Western Australia)
Suburbs in the City of Canning